Grabovoi or Grabovoy (Russian: Грабовой) is a Russian masculine surname, its feminine counterpart is Grabovaya. It may refer to the following notable people:
Artyom Grabovoi (1983–2014), Russian serial killer
Grigori Grabovoi (born 1963), Russian spiritual leader

Russian-language surnames